The Maine State Auditor is a statutory state executive position in the government of the U.S. state of Maine. According to the Office of the State Auditor's webpage, the primary purpose of the position is "to audit the financial statements of the State of Maine and expenditures of federal programs".

The Office of State Auditor was created in 1883 to examine the accounts held by the Maine State Treasurer. Originally a three-member committee, the single State Auditor position was created in 1907. State Auditors are elected by the Maine Legislature for a term of four years and each Auditor is limited to two four-year terms.

Qualifications
According to statute, the State Auditor "..shall be a certified public accountant or a college graduate with not less than 6 years of experience as a professional accountant or auditor, including not less than 5 years of auditing experience, of which not less than 4 years shall have been in a supervisory capacity".

List of Maine State Auditors

References

 
Maine